Bayraklı Tunnels, formerly Karşıyaka Tunnels, are two motorway tunnels in series located on the İzmir's northern beltway, motorway  , in Bayraklı district between Karşıyaka and Bornova of Izmir Province, western Turkey.

The tunnels were built by Kutlutaş-Dillingham Consortium, and the construction completed on 30 April 1999. However, the construction of the motorway lasted until 2007. Along with the motorway, the tunnels were opened to traffic on 19 January 2007. The official opening took place in presence of Prime Minister Recep Tayyip Erdoğan on 4 February 2007.

Named initially Karşıyaka Tunnels, they were renamed later to Bayraklı Tunnels upon the request of the Bayraklı district's governor. The    (Bayraklı-1) and -long (Bayraklı-2) twin-tube tunnels carry three lanes of traffic in each direction. Dangerous goods carriers are not permitted to use the tunnel. Instead, they have to use either of the given routes:
Bornova exit-D550-Altınyol-Girne Boulevard-Karşıyaka Entry
Bayraklı exit-street #1620/39-street #1620/41-street #1609-Kubilay avenue-Onur Neighbourhood Entry

See also
 List of motorway tunnels in Turkey

References

External links
 Map of road tunnels in Turkey  at General Directorate of Highways (Turkey) (KGM)

Road tunnels in Turkey
Tunnels completed in 2007
Buildings and structures in İzmir Province
Bayraklı District
2007 establishments in Turkey
Transport in İzmir Province